Phryganodes tagiadalis is a moth in the family Crambidae. It was described by George Hampson in 1899. It is found in Papua New Guinea, where it has been recorded from the D'Entrecasteaux Islands (Fergusson Island).

Description 
Phryganodes tagiadalis is a mostly black-brown moth with a slight purplish gloss. However, some parts are not black-brown, but rather white. These are the legs, belly (called a ventral), frons (part of the forehead), underside of hind wing, and genital tufts on the males.

References

Spilomelinae
Moths described in 1899